Foveolina is a genus of flowering plants in the daisy family, native to southern Africa.

 Species
 Foveolina albidiformis (Thell.) Källersjö - Cape Province
 Foveolina dichotoma (DC.) Källersjö - Cape Province
 Foveolina schinziana (Thell.) Källersjö - Namibia
 Foveolina tenella (DC.) Källersjö - Cape Province

References

Anthemideae
Flora of Southern Africa
Asteraceae genera